Juan Diego González-Vigil Bentin (born 18 February 1985) is a Peruvian footballer who plays as a striker. He is currently without a club.

Club career
He also played for Coronel Bolognesi, Málaga CF, S.V. Zulte Waregem and Cienciano.

He participated in the UEFA Cup and the Copa Libertadores.

On October 24, 2010 Juan Diego scored a notable goal for Deportivo Quito from a distance of 45 meters away.

After his spell in Ecuador, he decided to go back to Peru. On February 2, 2011 he joined the 2010 runners-up León de Huánuco.

On June 3, 2011 it was announced that Juan Diego joined Sporting Cristal in the middle of the 2011 Torneo Descentralizado season.
He signed a contract that lasted until the end of the 2011 season.

International career
He played for the Peru U20 and Peru U23 sides.

On November 11, 2010 Juan Diego was called up by the new Peru national team coach Sergio Markarian to play in a friendly match against Colombia. The friendly was played on November 17, 2010 in Bogota and finished in a 1–1 draw. He came on in the 66th minute replacing José Carlos Fernández.

Honours

Club
Alianza Lima
Torneo Descentralizado: 2003, 2004

References

External links

1985 births
Living people
Footballers from Lima
Peruvian people of Italian descent
Association football forwards
Peruvian footballers
Peru international footballers
Club Deportivo Wanka footballers
FC Lokomotivi Tbilisi players
Club Alianza Lima footballers
Atlético Malagueño players
S.V. Zulte Waregem players
Cienciano footballers
Club Universitario de Deportes footballers
Coronel Bolognesi footballers
FC Cartagena footballers
S.D. Quito footballers
León de Huánuco footballers
Sporting Cristal footballers
Club Deportivo Universidad de San Martín de Porres players
Deportivo Municipal footballers
Peruvian Primera División players
Málaga CF players
Peruvian expatriate footballers
Expatriate footballers in Ecuador
Expatriate footballers in Spain
Expatriate footballers in Belgium
Expatriate footballers in Georgia (country)